Miriam ossuary is a decorated limestone ossuary from a tomb in the Valley of Elah, Israel, which bears an inscription attributing it to "Miriam, the daughter of Yeshua."

History
The Miriam ossuary came to light in June 2011. Archaeologists from Bar-Ilan and Tel Aviv Universities announced that it had been  plundered from a tomb in the Valley of Elah. The Israel Antiquities Authority declared it authentic, and expressed regret that it couldn't be studied in situ. It is inscribed with the text: "Miriam, daughter of Yeshua, son of Caiaphas, Priest of Ma’aziah from Beth ‘Imri". Based on it, Caiaphas can be assigned to the priestly course of Ma’aziah, instituted by King David.

The script is formal, in a style common in ossuary inscriptions of the late Second Temple period.

See also
 Caiaphas ossuary
 Archaeology of Israel

References

2011 archaeological discoveries
Archaeological discoveries in Israel
Archaeological discoveries in the West Bank
Caiaphas
Ossuaries
Valley of Elah
Women and death